Robert Crispin Tinley (25 October 1830 – 11 December 1900) was an English first-class cricketer in the mid-19th century who was recognised as one of the best slow bowlers of his time.

Tinley was born at Southwell, Nottinghamshire, and played for Nottinghamshire County Cricket Club and the All-England Eleven. He batted right-handed and was a right-arm slow bowler of underarm lobs.
 
Tinley made his first-class debut in the 1847 season and made 117 appearances between then and the 1874 season. He took 309 wickets at an average of 14.46 with a best analysis of 8 for 12 (in a match in which he also took 7 for 66 in the second innings). He took 10 wickets in a match on five occasions. He was a useful tail-end batsman who made three fifties with a highest score of 56. He scored 2004 runs in all at an average of 11.38. He also took 143 catches and, as an occasional wicket-keeper, two stumpings.

The teams Tinley played for were: Nottinghamshire (1847-1869); Manchester (1851); All-England Eleven (1851-1874); North (1851-1865); England XI (1855-1860); Players (1858-1864); Another England Eleven (1860); England "Next XIV" (1860); combined Kent and Nottinghamshire  
(1864). George Parr's XI (1863/64) (during this trip, the team sailed to Australia on the SS Great Britain

He died at Burton-on-Trent, Staffordshire, aged 70.

References

 Scores & Biographies by Arthur Haygarth

External links
 
 Cris Tinley at CricketArchive
 Wisden obituary

1830 births
1900 deaths
English cricketers
All-England Eleven cricketers
English cricketers of 1826 to 1863
English cricketers of 1864 to 1889
Nottinghamshire cricketers
North v South cricketers
Players cricketers
People from Southwell, Nottinghamshire
Cricketers from Nottinghamshire
Manchester Cricket Club cricketers